Fairview Christian School was a private Mennonite school in Albany, Oregon, United States. Opened in 1975, the school was run by the Fairview Mennonite Church. The school moved to a new building in 1984, and closed in May 2009.

References

Buildings and structures in Albany, Oregon
Christian schools in Oregon
Defunct Christian schools in the United States
Defunct schools in Oregon
High schools in Linn County, Oregon
Private middle schools in Oregon
Private elementary schools in Oregon
Private high schools in Oregon
1975 establishments in Oregon
2009 disestablishments in Oregon
Educational institutions established in 1975
Educational institutions disestablished in 2009